Jaffna Central College ( Yāḻppāṇam Mattiya Kallūri, JCC) is a national school in Jaffna, Sri Lanka. Founded in 1816 by British Methodist missionaries, it is one of Sri Lanka's oldest schools.

History
In 1813 the Methodist's British Conference approved the establishment of missions in Ceylon, Java and the Cape of Good Hope. On 30 December 1813 Dr Coke, seven missionaries (William Ault, Benjamin Clough, George Erskine, Martin Harvard, James Lynch, Thomas H. Squance) and two of the missionaries' wives left Portsmouth and sailed to Ceylon. Mrs Ault and Dr. Coke died on the journey. When the arrived in Bombay they had little money but they were helped by Governor Evan Nepean and W. T. Money, a merchant. Five of the missionaries (Ault, Clough, Erskine, Lynch and Squance) sailed from Bombay on 20 June 1814 and arrived in Galle on the south coast of Ceylon on 29 June 1814. On 11 July 1814 the missionaries gathered together to decide who would be stationed where – Lynch and Squance were to go to Jaffna in the north; Ault was to go to Batticaloa in the east; Erskine was to go to Matara in the south; and Clough was to remain in Galle. Clough was later joined by Harvard and his wife. Lynch and Squance left Galle on 14 July 1814 and arrived in Jaffna on 10 August 1814 where they established the Wesleyan Methodist Mission, North Ceylon.

On 1 August 1816 the mission purchased from the government the former orphanage situated opposite the esplanade in Jaffna. In the period of 1816 - 1817 the Jaffna Wesleyan English School was founded with Rev. Lynch as principal. The school transferred to the Vembadi site in 1825. The school was renamed Jaffna Central School in 1834 by the then principal Rev. Dr. Peter Percival. In the same year a separate girls school was established which was renamed Vembadi Girls' High School in 1897. JCC prospered, becoming affiliated to Madras University (1869) and Calcutta University (1897).

In 1945 JCC started providing free education. Most private schools in Ceylon, including JCC, were taken over by the government in 1960. In 1994 JCC became a national school.

JCC's principal Kanapathy Rajadurai was shot dead on 12 October 2005 in Jaffna.

Crest
JCC's crest and colours were introduced in 1901 by Romaine Cooke, the then vice-principal. The lower arc of the crest contains JCC's moto: In gloriam Dei optimi maximi (Unto the glory of God, the best and the highest). The key symbolises JCC being an instrument that unlocks those leading to knowledge. The yarl symbolises JCC's host city Jaffna. The rising sun symbolises the light of learning that radiates from JCC.

Big Match
JCC play St. John's College, Jaffna in an annual cricket match known as the Battle of the North or the Battle of the Blues. The first match took place in 1904. No matches were played in 1948, 1961, 1985, 1986, 1987, 1988, 1989, 1991, 1996 and 1997. The 1967 match was abandoned due to bad weather. The schools played two matches in 1904, 1908, 1909, 1918, 1919, 1921 and 1922. Central won the 1904 match but it wasn't until 1908 that St. John's won a match.

Academic staff

Principals

 1816 Rev. James Lynch
 1819 Rev. James Lynch
 1820–24 Rev. Robert Carver
 1825 Rev. Joseph Roberts
 1834–51 Rev. Dr. Peter Percival
 1852–54 Rev. John Walton
 1855 Rev. William Barber
 1859–61 Rev. William Talbot
 1862–66 Rev. John Mitchell
 1867–70 Rev. John O. Rhodes
 1870–72 Rev. D.P. Niles (acting)
 1873–74 Rev. Samuel R. Wilkin
 1874–76 Rev. William R. Winston
 1877–78 Edward Strutt
 1879–81 Fredrick M. Webster
 1882 Thomas Little
 1883 William J. G. Bestall
 1884 Joseph West
 1885–86 Rev. A. E. Restarick
 1886–87 Rev. D. P. Niles (acting)
 1888–89 Rev. Sheldon Knapp
 1890 Rev. E. Middleton Weaver
 1891–93 Rev. W. T. Garret
 1894–95 Rev. Gabriel Leese
 1896–98 Rev. W. T. Garret
 1899 Rev. George B. Robeson (acting)
 1900 Rev. E. O. Martin
 1901 Rev. Arthur Lockwood
 1901–03 Rev. W. T. Garret
 1903–08 Rev. W. M. P. Wilkes
 1908–10 Rev. H. A. Meek
 1910–16 Rev. W. M. P. Wilkes
 1916 Rev. E. T. Selby (acting)
 1917–21 Rev. Harold Bullough
 1921 Rev. H.R. Cornish (acting)
 1922–26 Rev. Percy T. Cash
 1927 J. K. Chanmukam (acting)
 1928–32 Rev. Percy T. Cash
 1933 R. J. Seal (acting)
 1934–39 Rev. Percy T. Cash
 1940–42 R. S. D. Williams
 1943–44 J. W. Arudpragasam
 1945–55 Rev. C. A. Smith
 1949 J. C. Charles (acting)
 1956–62 Rev. Dr. D. T. Niles
 1962–64 A. E. Tamber
 1964–71 E. Sabalingam
 1971–80 E. K. Shanmuganathan
 1980–82 N. S. Rathinasingham
 1983–90 V. Balasuntharam
 1990 N. Rasaratnam
 1990–96 N. K. Shanmuganathapillai
 1996 S. Sivanrooban (acting)
 1996–05 K. Rajadurai
 2006–08 S. Pathmanathan (acting)
 2009–11 L. Ongaramoorthy
 2011– S. K. Elilventhan

Notable alumni

See also
 List of schools in Northern Province, Sri Lanka

Notes

References

External links

 
 
 
 
 
 ‘Celebration of Central’(Colombo, 2016)

 
1816 establishments in Ceylon
Academic institutions formerly affiliated with the University of Madras
Boarding schools in Sri Lanka
Boys' schools in Sri Lanka
Educational institutions established in 1816
Former Methodist schools in Sri Lanka
National schools in Sri Lanka
Schools in Jaffna
Wesleyan Methodist Mission of Ceylon (North) schools